Sean Michael McDermott (born March 21, 1974) is an American football coach who is the head coach for the Buffalo Bills of the National Football League (NFL). He began his NFL coaching career as an assistant  for the Philadelphia Eagles in 2001, serving as defensive coordinator from 2009 to 2010, and was later the defensive coordinator of the Carolina Panthers from 2011 to 2016. Following his six seasons with the Panthers, which included a Super Bowl appearance in Super Bowl 50, he was hired in 2017 as the Bills' head coach. 

McDermott's head coaching tenure in Buffalo has seen improved fortunes for the franchise, which had been mostly unsuccessful during the 2000s and 2010s. In his first season, he led the Bills to their first playoff appearance since 1999, ending the longest active postseason drought in the four major North American sports. During the 2020 season, McDermott helped the Bills clinch their division and win a playoff game for the first time since 1995, en route to their first AFC Championship Game appearance since 1993. He led the Bills to a consecutive division title the following season, the franchise's first since 1991.

Early years
Born in Omaha, Nebraska, McDermott grew up in the Philadelphia suburbs. His family lived in West Chester and Paoli before settling in Lansdale when McDermott was in second grade. McDermott first attended North Penn High School before transferring to La Salle College High School, where he was named All-Southeastern Pennsylvania at defensive back in 1992 and graduated in 1993. He was also a national prep champion wrestler in 1992 and 1993. He received a bachelor's degree in finance while at the College of William and Mary, where he was an all-conference safety (1997). He was teammates with future Pittsburgh Steelers head coach Mike Tomlin, who was a wide receiver and faced McDermott frequently. He also received Academic all-conference honors in 1996 and 1997 and NSCA Strength and Conditioning All-America accolades.

Coaching career

Philadelphia Eagles
McDermott originally joined the Philadelphia Eagles in 1999 as a scouting administrative coordinator, a position he held until being promoted to Andy Reid's coaching staff in 2001. He then became defensive quality control coach and later assistant defensive backs coach. In 2003, he replaced Steve Spagnuolo as defensive backs coach, as Spagnuolo was assigned linebackers coach. In 2004, McDermott saw both of his starting safeties (Brian Dawkins and Michael Lewis) earn Pro Bowl berths for the first time in team history. McDermott and the Eagles appeared in Super Bowl XXXIX that season but lost to the New England Patriots, who won their second straight Super Bowl title. Under McDermott's watch, Dawkins went on to earn two more Pro Bowl berths following the 2005 and 2006 seasons.

In 2007, McDermott was assigned linebackers coach, after Spagnuolo had left to take the defensive coordinator job for the New York Giants. On January 28, 2008, Eagles head coach Andy Reid named McDermott as the secondary coach again.
 
On May 18, 2009, McDermott was named the interim defensive coordinator as a result of defensive coordinator Jim Johnson's medical leave of absence. On July 24, of that same year, due to the continuing decline of Johnson, the Eagles announced McDermott would take over as full-time defensive coordinator. Johnson died four days later. Thanks in part to what he learned under Johnson, McDermott would go on to implement a variety of blitzes in his later defensive gameplans.

McDermott was fired as the defensive coordinator on January 15, 2011, after 12 years with the Eagles.

Carolina Panthers
McDermott was hired as the defensive coordinator of the Carolina Panthers on January 17, 2011. McDermott was reunited with new Panthers head coach Ron Rivera, a former Eagles assistant whom McDermott served alongside from 1999-2003. McDermott was Pro Football Focus's second runner up to their Defensive Coordinator of the Year award in 2015.

As the Panthers' defensive coordinator, McDermott led the team to finishes in the top ten in overall defense from 2012–2015.

In the 2015 season, McDermott and the Panthers reached Super Bowl 50, which was played on February 7, 2016. His defense only gave up one offensive touchdown in the game, but the Panthers fell to the Denver Broncos by a score of 24–10.

Buffalo Bills
On January 11, 2017, McDermott was hired by the Buffalo Bills as the 19th head coach in franchise history.

On September 10, 2017, McDermott won his NFL head coaching debut in the season opening 21–12 victory over the New York Jets, becoming just the third Bills head coach to win his first game with the team after Marv Levy and Rex Ryan.

Just after a Week 2 loss to the Carolina Panthers, also McDermott's first return to Charlotte since leaving the Panthers organization, McDermott would lead the Bills to 4 wins in the next 5 games, including a win against the reigning NFC champion Atlanta Falcons. However, they lost the next two games, including a 47–10 loss to the New Orleans Saints, which prompted him to make the controversial decision to bench starting quarterback Tyrod Taylor in favor of rookie backup Nathan Peterman. Peterman played poorly against the Los Angeles Chargers in his first career start, throwing 5 interceptions in the first half. He was benched for Taylor during the second half of the 54–24 loss, which dropped the Bills to 5–5.

Despite the string of losses, the Bills then went on a 4–2 run to finish the season at 9–7, clinching the AFC's 6th seed and their first playoff appearance in 18 years, thus ending both the NFL's and the North American professional sports franchise's longest active playoff droughts during McDermott's first year as head coach. The Bills would go on to lose to the Jacksonville Jaguars 10–3 in the AFC wild card game.

The following season, McDermott's Bills finished 6–10 and missed the playoffs, but had a strong finish to the season after a 2–7 start. After suffering blowout losses in four of the first nine games, partly caused by a lack of offensive talent, the Bills adjusted their roster, allowing them to stay competitive in each of the last seven games. Buffalo's defense improved in 2018.

McDermott was nominated for NFL Head Coach of the Year for the 2019 season after leading the Bills to a 10–6 record, receiving their second playoff berth in three seasons as the AFC's #5 seed. The Bills would lose 22–19 to the Houston Texans in overtime during the Wild Card Round.

On August 12, 2020, McDermott signed a contract extension through 2025.

The 2020 season marked many instances of growth and success for McDermott and the Bills. Quarterback Josh Allen developed dramatically, turning into an MVP candidate and leading the Bills to their first AFC East Division Title since 1995, as well as a 13–3 record, tied for second best in the league with the Green Bay Packers and behind the Kansas City Chiefs. They also tied a franchise record for wins previously set in 1990 and 1991. After winning their first division title since 1995, they won their first playoff game in 25 years with a win against the Indianapolis Colts in the Wild Card Round, before defeating the Baltimore Ravens 17–3 for a trip to their first AFC Championship Game in 27 years.

In the AFC Championship, the Bills lost to the Kansas City Chiefs 38–24, ending their 2020 season, and ending the Bills' hopes of returning to the Super Bowl for the first time in 27 years. McDermott was questioned by fans and analysts for his play calling, with criticism specifically aimed at his decision making in regards to attempting field goals instead of touchdowns on a pair of fourth and goal situations. The Bills finished their 2020 season with a cumulative record of 15–4.

Prior to the 2021 season, the Bills increased protection for Allen by drafting offensive tackle Spencer Brown from Northern Iowa. After losing the season opener verus Pittsburgh 23–16, the Bills went on a four–game winning streak, including a 35–0 shutout against Miami and a 40–0 shutout over Houston. The Bills had a record of 5–1 within the division, with the sole loss to New England having taken place during particularly poor weather—wind gusts nearby were measured at over 55 miles per hour. Overall, the Bills would finish 11–6. In the AFC Wild Card game, they beat the Patriots 47–17 in a 'perfect' offensive performance, with each Buffalo possession ending in either a touchdown or kneeling to end the period. There was much anticipation going into the next round, as they would be once again be facing the Chiefs, led by Patrick Mahomes. In what has been regarded  as the best game of the 2021–22 season, a high-scoring shootout between Allen and Mahomes reached its climax in the final two minutes of the fourth quarter, where a combined 25 points were scored. The Bills had emerged from the fracas with 13 seconds left in regulation and a 36–33 lead. However, Buffalo's defense would not hold, and Kansas City was able to score a field goal to tie the game up 36–36 as time expired. The Chiefs then won the coin toss for possession to begin overtime, and ultimately scored a touchdown on the resulting drive to win the game 42–36. After the season, partially in reaction to this result—given Buffalo's offense was not given a chance to participate in the overtime period—the NFL changed their postseason rules to guarantee both teams a possession of the ball, even if the opening drive results in a touchdown.

In the 2022 season, McDermott led the Bills to a 13–3 record and a first-place finish in the AFC East.  The Bills did not play 17 games in 2022 due to the Damar Hamlin incident in Week 17, which McDermott got praise for helping cancel. The Bills won the Wild Card Round against the Miami Dolphins 34–31. The Bills' season ended in the Divisional Round with a 27–10 loss to the Cincinnati Bengals.

Head coaching record

Personal life
McDermott and his wife have two children. He is a devout Christian and has been outspoken on his faith.

In 2021, McDermott revealed that he has been treated for skin cancer "several times" since at least 2017.

References

External links
Coaching statistics at Pro-Football-Reference.com
Buffalo Bills bio

1974 births
Living people
American football defensive backs
Buffalo Bills head coaches
Carolina Panthers coaches
National Football League defensive coordinators
Philadelphia Eagles coaches
Sportspeople from Montgomery County, Pennsylvania
Sportspeople from Omaha, Nebraska
William & Mary Tribe football coaches
William & Mary Tribe football players
Coaches of American football from Pennsylvania
American people of Scottish descent
American Presbyterians
People from Lansdale, Pennsylvania
Buffalo Bills coaches